NYPD Blue is an American television police procedural drama series that aired on ABC from September 21, 1993, to March 1, 2005. Created by Steven Bochco and David Milch, the show follows the cases of the fictional 15th Precinct of Manhattan, as well as the individual lives of its workers. Featuring a changing ensemble of actors, Dennis Franz and Gordon Clapp were among the longest lasting cast members, appearing in every season in a major capacity.

NYPD Blue has garnered critical acclaim for its honest and gritty portrayal of the officers' personal and professional lives. Since its debut, the series has been nominated for 84 Primetime Emmy awards (winning 20), 13 Golden Globe awards (winning four), 23 SAG awards (winning three), 8 Directors Guild of America awards (winning two), 11 Satellite awards (winning two) and 11 TCA awards (winning one) among others. The series also garnered various industry and pop culture awards and nominations.

Many of the actors and crew members were recognized for their individual work, winning several Emmy, Golden Globe, and SAG awards among others. Dennis Franz, the lead actor of the series, won 4 Emmy awards, a Golden Globe award, 3 SAG awards, and 5 Q awards, becoming the most decorated cast member of the series. Kim Delaney and Jimmy Smits won an Emmy award and a Golden Globe, respectively, for their performances on the series, in addition to receiving several nominations for Emmy awards, Golden Globe Awards, Golden Satellite awards and SAG awards.

Awards and nominations

ALMA Awards

The American Latino Media Arts Award, commonly known as the ALMA Award, is an annual accolade bestowed by the National Council of La Raza recognizing American Latino contributions to television, film and music. Jimmy Smits, of Puerto Rican descent, won three awards for his role in the series while Esai Morales, also of Puerto Rican, won an award for Outstanding Actor in a Television Series in 2002.

American Society of Cinematographers
The American Society of Cinematographers Awards was created in 1986 by the American Society of Cinematographers. It honors work in theatrical features, television projects and student films, and cinematographers and other filmmakers for their career achievements. NYPD Blue received six award nominations, five for Outstanding Achievement in Cinematography in Regular Series and one for Outstanding Achievement in Cinematography in Movies of the Week/Pilots.

Artios Awards
Presented by the Casting Society of America since 1985, the Artios Awards is an annual accolade that honors excellence in casting. NYPD Blue received seven nominations for the award for Best Casting for TV, Dramatic Episodic during its tenure. The series won in 1994, as well as winning for Best Casting for TV, Pilot.

BMI Film & TV Awards

Cinema Audio Society Awards
The Cinema Audio Society Awards, commonly abbreviated as a CAS Awards, was created in 1964 and honors outstanding achievement in sound mixing. NYPD Blue received eight award nominations, winning two awards for Outstanding Achievement in Sound Mixing for a Television Series for episodes "Simone Says" and "Unembraceable You."

Directors Guild of America Awards

Presented by the Directors Guild of America since 1938, The Directors Guild of America Award honors excellence in the field of direction. NYPD Blue received eight nominations for the award for Outstanding Directorial Achievement in Drama Series, winning two.

Edgar Allan Poe Awards

Presented by the Mystery Writers of America since 1954, the Edgar Allan Poe Awards are awarded to the best in mystery fiction, non-fiction, television, film, and theater. Receiving five nominations during its tenure, NYPD Blue won three awards for Best Television Episode.

Emmy Awards
The Primetime Emmy Award is an annual accolade presented by the Academy of Television Arts & Sciences for outstanding achievement in American prime time television programming. The Primetime Emmy Award recognizes outstanding achievement in aspects such as acting, writing, and direction while the more technical aspects such as cinematography, casting and, as of 2011, guest acting performances in television, are awarded at the Creative Arts Emmy Awards. During its tenure, NYPD Blue received 84 nominations, winning 20 of them. NYPD Blue won the award for Outstanding Drama Series in 1995 while receiving nominations from 1994 to 1999. Dennis Franz received a nomination for Outstanding Lead Actor in a Drama Series every between 1994 and 2001, winning four times in 1994, 1996, 1997, and 1999. Jimmy Smits was also nominated in the category five consecutive times between 1995 and 1999. The series was nominated for Outstanding Supporting Actor in a Drama Series four times, with Nicholas Turturro receiving nods in 1994 and 1997, James McDaniel in 1996, and Gordon Clapp in 1998. The show also received nominations for Outstanding Supporting Actress in a Drama Series from 1994 to 1999, with Sharon Lawrence and Gail O'Grady contending for the award in 1994 to 1996. Kim Delaney was nominated in the category consecutively from 1997 to 1999, winning in 1997. Amy Brenneman was also nominated for the award during the first season and was nominated for Outstanding Guest Actress in a Drama Series during season two. Shirley Knight won the award for Outstanding Guest Actress in a Drama Series in 1995 while Debra Monk won the award in 1999. The award for Outstanding Directing for a Drama Series was awarded to Paris Barclay in 1998 and 1999, Daniel Sackheim in 1994 and Mark Tinker in 1997. NYPD Blue won the award for Outstanding Writing for a Drama Series in 1994 to Ann Biderman, in 1997 to David Milch, Stephen Gaghan, and Michael R. Perry, and in 1998 to David Milch, Nicholas Wootton and Bill Clark.

Primetime Emmy Awards

Creative Arts Emmy Awards

Golden Globe Awards

Presented since 1949, the Golden Globe Award is an annual accolade awarded by the Hollywood Foreign Press Association for outstanding achievements in film and television. NYPD Blue received 13 nominations during its tenure, winning four awards for Best Actor – Television Series Drama, awarded to David Caruso in 1994, Dennis Franz in 1995,  and Jimmy Smits in 1996.

Golden Satellite Awards

The Satellite Award is an annual accolade bestowed by the International Press Academy since 1997 in recognition of outstanding achievements in film, television and new media. NYPD Blue won two awards (out of 11) for Best Television Series – Drama and Best Actor – Television Series Drama, awarded to Jimmy Smits, in 1998.

Humanitas Prize

Awarded since 1974, the Humanitas Prize is an annual accolade that recognizes outstanding achievement of writers in film and television whose work promotes human dignity, meaning and freedom. NYPD Blue received three nominations for the award in the 60 Minute Category, winning twice in 1994 and 1997, and two nominations for the 90 Minute Category, winning once in 2000.

Screen Actors Guild Awards
Presented by the Screen Actors Guild, the Screen Actors Guild (SAG) Award recognizes outstanding individual and ensemble performances. Dennis Franz won two SAG awards for his individual performance on the series while the cast won an award for Outstanding Performance by an Ensemble in a Drama Series.

Television Critics Association Awards
Awarded since 1984, the TCA Award is an annual accolade presented by the Television Critics Association in recognition of excellence in television. Out of 13 nominations, NYPD Blue won the award for Outstanding Achievement in Drama in 1994.

TV Land Awards
The TV Land Award is an award presented at the eponymous award ceremony, airing on TV Land, that honors television programs that are off air. Receiving 13 nominations since the first award ceremony, The Mary Tyler Moore Show won five awards, including Groundbreaking Show and Broadcaster of the Year, the latter posthumously awarded to Ted Knight three times.

Viewers for Quality Television Awards

The Q Award, presented by the Viewers for Quality Television, honors programs and performers that the organization deem are of the highest quality. Out of 25 nominations, NYPD Blue won six awards – one for Best Quality Drama Series and five for Best Actor in a Quality Drama Series, awarded to Dennis Franz.

Young Artist Awards
The Young Artist Award is an annual accolade presented by the Young Artist Association in recognition of outstanding achievements by performers aged 5 to 21 in film, television, theater and music. Austin Majors, who portrayed Andy Sipowicz's son Theo, received four award nominations, winning once for Best Performance in a TV Series (Comedy or Drama) - Young Actor Age Ten or Under.

Other awards

References

External links
 List of Primetime Emmy Awards received by NYPD Blue
 List of awards and nominations received by NYPD Blue at the Internet Movie Database

NYPD Blue